Niger Airlines is the Nigerien flag carrier headquartered in Niamey and based at Diori Hamani International Airport.

History
The airline was founded in 2012 and started services in 2014 to replace defunct Air Niger. It commenced services with domestic operations connecting mining settlements as well as pilgrimage flights. In November 2022, Niger Airlines has been grounded by the Nigerien authorities citing safety concerns.

Destinations
Niger Airlines currently serves the following domestic destinations:

Fleet

Current fleet
As of November 2022, the Niger Airlines fleet consists of the following aircraft:

Retired fleet
Niger Airlines formerly also operated the following aircraft types:

References 

2012 establishments in Niger
Airlines of Niger
Airlines established in 2012
Companies based in Niamey